Jasmeen Patheja  is a human rights activist in India and was born in Kolkata, West Bengal. She graduated from Srishti School of Art Design and Technology in fine arts. She is a former Ashoka Fellow and works towards gender sensitization. She has been bringing attention to sexism and harassment in forms such as eve teasing, a form of sexual harassment which is very common in India. She established Blank Noise for the same purpose.

Blank Noise
Jasmeen started the Blank Noise as a student project at Srishti in Bangalore in 2003.  This has since spread out to other cities in India and globally. The purpose of Blank Noise was to create gender sensitisation regarding street harassment and eve teasing. The project exclusively works towards tackling gender-based violence. It intends to shift the blame of eve teasing from victims to the perpetrators. It also provides legal counselling in case women want legal redressal for sexual harassment. It works on ground with victims and is trying to suggest tougher laws against street harassment while improving on the existing ones. The project addresses the issue with innovative ways such as street performances and confrontational protests. Initially, Jasmeen started with going to Colleges but later came to the conclusion street activism would be more effective.

Jasmeen also uses new and mainstream media to spread awareness around the topic. She has created a blog which brings together diverse groups of people through discussions, questionnaires, testimonials, and photographs. People often volunteer to participate in Blank Noise's public performances and campaigns.  Jasmeen has consciously sought new communities with which to collaborate, including youth groups, volunteers from slums, women bus conductors, police, and men.

Personal life 
Born in Kolkata, her family migrated to India from Burma in the 1960s. Her grandmother has been a strong influence in her life. She started engaging in activism from her time in college as an undergraduate student when she realized that street harassment was a systemic problem.

She has been a TED and an Ashoka Fellow.

References

External links
https://www.blindaim.com/2018/11/jasmeen-patheja.html  
http://fellows.ted.com/profiles/jasmeen-patheja 

http://stream.wsj.com/story/latest-headlines/SS-2-63399/SS-2-293803/

Ashoka India Fellows
Living people
Artists from Kolkata
Indian women activists
1979 births